Promise Jason Jamal Shepherd, professionally known as Promise, is a Canadian rapper from Toronto. He is also 1/2 of Hip-Hop supergroup Perfeck Strangers, based in Scarborough, Ontario. Promise has collaborated with Jhené Aiko, Montell Jordan, LeCrae, No Malice, MC Jin, J. Ivy, Marco Polo, eLZhi of Slum Village, Royce Da 5'9" of Slaughterhouse, Rhymefest, and Ton3x. He has also collaborated heavily with fellow Toronto native Drake, whom he met on the set of Degrassi: The Next Generation.

Discography

Studio albums
2002: The Promise That Heaven Kept
2008: More Than Music
2011: Awakening

Extended plays
2016: TellAVision (EP)

Singles
2003: "Alright"
2008: "In God We Trust" (featuring J. Ivy, Calvin Richardson and Elzhi of Slum Village)
2008: "Change" (featuring Mr. Probz, Supastition and Royce Da 5'9")
2011: "Against the Odds" (featuring Jhené Aiko)
2012" "Make a Change"

Mixtapes

2005: "AmiRacle"
2006: "Music"
2007: "Dj L'oqenz: Kanye West presents Promise Vol.1"
2008: "Dj Mensa: Kanye West presents Promise Vol.2"
2009: "2dopeboyz Presents: D.O.P.E. Mixtape"

Guest appearances
2004: N.I.F.T.Y. – "The Real" (The Preface EP) featuring Manafest and Promise
2006: Manafest – "Critics" (Glory) featuring Promise
2008:  Tonéx aka Ton3x – "Maverick" featuring Promise
2010: Shad – "Time" featuring Promise
2010: "The Bridge" (The Stupendous Adventures of Marco Polo) featuring Promise
2011: NBA 2K11 OST – "Better Than You" featuring Duck Down All-Stars: Buckshot, Skyzoo and Sean Price (prod. Double-O of Kidz in the Hall) and in video game as character on celebrity list
2011: The Get By – "These Girls" (Let Go) Writer credit
2011: Buckshot, Smif N' Wessun, Promise – "Run To Remember"
2013: Various Artists – "These Girls Too" featuring GMF, Promise, Tona, Rich Kidd and The Get By
2014: Da' T.R.U.T.H. – Hope (Official Remix)" featuring This'l, Braille, Derek Minor, Promise

With Perfeck Strangers
2012: "Series Premiere" featuring Justin Nozuka, Wordsworth

Awards
 2002 CGMA Covenant Award for Hip-Hop/Rap Song of the Year for "Alright"
 2003 Vibe Award Nominee for Best Hip-Hop/Rap Album of the Year
 2003 UMAC Award Nominee for Best Gospel Recording for "Alright"
 2003 Maja Award for Best Urban Gospel
 2003 Maja Award Nominee for Best Male Artist of the Year
 2003 Maja Award Nominee for Best New Artist of the Year
 2007 Shai Award Nominee for Hip-Hop/Rap Album of the Year
 2009 CGMA Covenant Award for Hip-Hop/Rap Album of the Year for "More Than Music"

References

External links
 

1982 births
21st-century Black Canadian male singers
Canadian male rappers
21st-century Canadian rappers
Canadian hip hop singers
Living people
Musicians from Toronto
Canadian songwriters
Canadian soul singers
Writers from Toronto